John Arthur Cox IV (born July 6, 1981) is a Venezuelan-American professional basketball player. He is 1.96 m (6'5") tall, and he weighs 89 kg (195 lbs.).

College career
Cox played college basketball for the San Francisco Dons. He ended his career there as one of its all-time top scorers, lifting the team to a 2005 National Invitation Tournament (NIT) appearance.

Professional career
Cox has played pro basketball in France's top-tier level, the LNB Pro A, and in Europe's top-tier level, the EuroLeague.

On April 15, 2017, Cox signed with the French team Élan Béarnais Pau-Orthez.

National team career
Cox has represented Venezuela internationally on multiple occasions. He played for the team at the 2012 FIBA World Olympic Qualifying Tournament and the 2015 Pan American Games. He also played at the 2015 FIBA Americas Championship, where he was a part of Venezuela's first intercontinental title. He also played at the 2016 Summer Olympics. He was the leading scorer of the 2017 FIBA AmeriCup.

Personal life
Cox was born in Venezuela to American parents, at the time of his birth his father John "Chubby" Cox was playing basketball in Venezuela. His father also played for the Washington Bullets of the National Basketball Association (NBA). He is also first cousin of former Los Angeles Lakers guard Kobe Bryant. Both John and Chubby reached the LPB finals, one of six father-son pairs who managed to do so in Venezuela.

References

External links
Twitter Account
FIBA Profile
Euroleague.net Profile
Eurobasket.com Profile
French League Profile 

1981 births
Living people
American expatriate basketball people in France
American expatriate basketball people in Germany
American men's basketball players
Basketball players at the 2015 Pan American Games
Basketball players at the 2016 Summer Olympics
Basketball players from Philadelphia
Bucaneros de La Guaira players
Cholet Basket players
Élan Béarnais players
Élan Chalon players
Medi Bayreuth players
Olympic basketball players of Venezuela
Pan American Games competitors for Venezuela
Metropolitans 92 players
Point guards
San Francisco Dons men's basketball players
Shooting guards
SLUC Nancy Basket players
STB Le Havre players
Venezuelan expatriate basketball people in France
Venezuelan expatriate basketball people in Germany
Venezuelan men's basketball players
Venezuelan people of American descent